For film awards, special awards were conferred in the 1980s and 1990s for the best political film at the East-West Center Film Festival, now the Hawaii International Film Festival. The awards for 2001 and 2009 were conferred because those films had not been properly nominated for the years when they were first screened. The 1990, 1995, and 2010 films were voted the best films on Hawai`i.

1987 The Killing Fields
1988 Vietnam
1989 A City of Sadness
1990 Pele's Appeal
1991 City of Hope
1992 Midnight Express
1993 Farewell, My Concubine
1994 Bombay
1995 Picture Bride
1996 Six O'Clock News
1997 Poverty Outlaw
2001 The Distinguished Gentleman
2009 The Cider House Rules
2010 Princess Ka`iulani

References

American film awards